The Andean-Saharan glaciation, also known as the Early Palaeozoic Icehouse, the Early Palaeozoic Ice Age, the Late Ordovician glaciation, the end-Ordovician glaciation, or the Hirnantian glaciation, occurred during the Paleozoic from approximately 460 Ma to around 420 Ma, during the Late Ordovician and the Silurian period. The major glaciation during this period was formerly thought only to consist of the Hirnantian glaciation itself but has now been recognized as a longer, more gradual event, which began as early as the Darriwilian, and possibly even the Floian. Evidence of this glaciation can be seen in places such as Arabia, North Africa, South Africa, Brazil, Peru, Bolivia, Chile, Argentina, and Wyoming. More evidence derived from isotopic data is that during the Late Ordovician, tropical ocean temperatures were about 5 °C cooler than present day; this would have been a major factor that aided in the glaciation process.

The Late Ordovician glaciation is widely considered to be the leading cause of the Late Ordovician mass extinction, and it is the only glacial episode that appears to have coincided with a major mass extinction of nearly 61% of marine life. Estimates of peak ice sheet volume range from 50 to 250 million cubic kilometers, and its duration from 35 million to less than 1 million years. At its height during the Hirnantian, the ice age is believed to have been significantly more extreme than the Last Glacial Maximum occurring during the terminal Pleistocene. Glaciation of the Northern Hemisphere was minimal because a large amount of the land was in the Southern Hemisphere.

Description 
The ice age may have begun as early as the Darriwilian, with some evidence suggesting its onset to have been even earlier, in the Floian. Eleven possible glacial intervals are known from before the Hirnantian: a mid-Darriwilian glaciation corresponding to the MDICE positive carbon isotope excursion, an early Sandbian glaciation, a middle Sanbdian glaciation, a late Sandbian glaciation, three very short glaciations during the early Katian, the Rakvere glaciation during the late early Katian, a middle Katian glaciation, the Early Ashgill glaciation of the early late Katian, and a latest Katian glaciation that was followed by a rapid warming event in the Paraorthograptus pacificus graptolite biozone immediately before the Hirnantian glaciation itself. Evidence of major changes in bottom water formation, which usually indicates a sudden change in global climate, is known from the Katian. However, the existence of glacials during the Katian remains controversial. At the Katian-Hirnantian boundary, a sudden cooling event, caused by a gamma ray burst or by an increase in carbon sequestration by land plants, resulted in a rapid expansion of glaciers, resulting in one of the most severe glaciations of the Phanerozoic. This extreme cooling event is generally believed to be coincident with the first pulse of the Late Ordovician mass extinction. At the end of the Hirnantian, an abrupt retreat of glaciers occurred, with the planet receding back into a milder icehouse phase that gradually disappeared over the course of the Silurian. Following the relatively warm Rhuddanian, glacial events occurred during the early and latest Aeronian. Two further glaciations occurred from the late Telychian to middle Sheinwoodian and from the early to late Homerian, corresponding to the Ireviken and Mulde events, respectively. The last major glaciation of the Early Palaeozoic Ice Age occurred during the Ludfordian and was associated with the Lau event.

During this period, glaciation is known from Arabia, Sahara, West Africa, the south Amazon, and the Andes, and the centre of glaciation is known to have migrated from the Sahara in the Ordovician (450–440 Ma) to South America in the Silurian (440–420 Ma). According to Eyles and Young, "A major glacial episode at c. 440 Ma, is recorded in Late Ordovician strata (predominantly Ashgillian) in West Africa (Tamadjert Formation of the Sahara), in Morocco (Tindouf Basin) and in west-central Saudi Arabia, all areas at polar latitudes at the time. From the Late Ordovician to the Early Silurian the centre of glaciation moved from northern Africa to southwestern South America." Continental glaciers developed in Africa and eastern Brazil, while alpine glaciers formed in the Andes. In western South America (Peru, Bolivia and northern Argentina) were found glacio-marine diamictites interbedded with turbidites, shales, mud flows and debris flows, dated as early Silurian (Llandonvery), with a southward extension into northern Argentina and western Paraguay, and with a probably northern extension into Peru, Ecuador and Colombia.

A major ice age, the Andean-Saharan was preceded by the Cryogenian ice ages (720–630 Ma, the Sturtian and Marinoan glaciations), often referred to as Snowball Earth, and followed by the Karoo Ice Age (350–260 Ma).

Evidence

Isotopic 

 Isotopic evidence points to a global Hirnantian positive shift in marine carbonate 18O, and at nearly the same time a positive shift in 13C known as the Hirnantian Isotopic Carbon Excursion. This evidence is further aided by the observation that both 18O and 13C fall sharply at the beginning of the Silurian.
 The direction of the 18O shift can imply glacial-cooling and possibly increases in ice-volume, and the magnitude of this shift (+4‰) was extraordinary.  The direction and magnitude of the 18O isotopic indicator would require a sea-level fall of 100 meters and a drop of 10 °C in tropical ocean temperatures.
 The positive shift in 13C implies a change in the carbon cycle leading to more burial of carbon, or at the very least production of more carbon with the removal of 12C in surface waters. This decrease points toward a decrease in the atmospheric CO2 levels which would have an inverse greenhouse effect, which would allow glaciation to occur more readily.

Lithologic 

 Sedimentological data shows that Late Ordovician ice sheets glacierized the Al Kufrah Basin.  Ice sheets also probably formed continuous ice cover over North African and the Arabian Peninsula.  In all areas of North African where Early Silurian shale occurs, Late Ordovician glaciogenic deposits occur beneath, likely due to the anoxia promoted in these basins.
 From what we know about tectonic movement, the time span required to allow the southward movement of Gondwana toward the South Pole would have been too long to trigger this glaciation.   Tectonic movement tends to take several million years, but the scale of the glaciation seems to have occurred in less than 1 million years, but the exact time frame of glaciation ranges from less than 1 million years to 35 million years, so it could still be possible for tectonic movement to have triggered this glacial period.
 The sequence of the stratigraphic architecture of the Bighorn Dolomite (which represents end of the Ordovician period), is consistent with the gradual buildup of glacial ice.  The sequences of the Bighorn Dolomite display systematic changes in their component cycles, and the changes in these cycles are interpreted as being a change from a greenhouse climate to a transitional ice house climate.

Biostratigraphic

 Graptolite distribution during the time interval delineated by the Nemacanthus gracilis graptolite biozone indicates a latitudinal extent of the subtropics and tropics similar to that of today, as evidenced by a steep faunal gradient that is uncharacteristic of greenhouse periods, suggesting that Earth was in a mild icehouse state by around 460 Ma.
 Although biostratigraphy dating the glacial deposits in Gondwana has been problematic, some evidence suggested an onset of glaciation as early as the Sandbian Stage (approximately 451–461 Ma).

Possible causes

CO2 depletion 
One of the factors that hindered glaciation during the early Paleozoic was atmospheric CO2 concentrations, which at the time were somewhere between 8 and 20 times pre-industrial levels. However, solar irradiance was significantly lower during the Late Ordovician; 450 million years ago, solar irradiance of Earth was about 1312.00 Wm−2 compared to 1360.89 Wm−2 in the present day. Furthermore, CO2 concentrations are thought to have dropped significantly in the Hirnantian, which could have induced widespread glaciation during an overall cooling trend. Methods for the removal of CO2 during this time were not well known, and are still hotly debated, with the radiation of terrestrial plants, a reduction in volcanic outgassing of carbon dioxide, and astronomically-induced increased marine absorption of carbon dioxide having been proposed. It could have been possible for glaciation to initiate with high levels of CO2, but it would have depended highly on continental configuration.

Long-term silicate weathering is a major mechanism through which CO2 is removed from the atmosphere, converting it into bicarbonate which is stored in marine sediments. This has often been linked to the Taconic Orogeny, a mountain-building event on the east coast of Laurentia (present-day North America). In more recent prehistory, the collision of India with Asia, and the subsequent creation of the Himalayas, has been proposed as a driver of late Cenozoic cooling. Another hypothesis is that a hypothetical large igneous province in the Katian led to basaltic flooding caused by high continental volcanic activity during that period. In the short term, this would have released a large amount of CO2 into the atmosphere, which may explain a warming pulse in the Katian. However, in the long term flood basalts would have left behind plains of basaltic rock, replacing exposures of granitic rock. Basaltic rocks weather substantially faster than granitic rocks, which would quickly remove CO2 from the atmosphere at a much faster rate than before the volcanic activity. CO2 levels could also have decreased due to accelerated silicate weathering caused by the expansion of terrestrial non-vascular plants. Vascular plants only appeared 15 Ma after the glaciation.

Gamma-ray burst 
A gamma-ray burst has been suggested by some researchers as the cause of the abrupt glaciation at the beginning of the Hirnantian. The effects of a ten second gamma-ray burst occurring within two kiloparsecs of Earth would have delivered it a fluence of 100 kilojoules per square metre. This would have resulted in a major depletion of ozone, a potent greenhouse gas, through its reaction with nitric oxide produced as a result of the burst's dissociation of diatomic nitrogen and subsequent reaction of nitrogen atoms with oxygen. Additionally, large amounts of nitric acid would rain down on Earth's surface in the aftermath of the gamma-ray burst, causing blooms of nitrate-limited photosynthesisers that would have sequestered large amounts of carbon dioxide from the atmosphere.

Ordovician meteor event 
The breakup of the L-chondrite parent body caused a rain of extraterrestrial material onto the Earth called the Ordovician meteor event. This event increased stratospheric dust by 3 or 4 orders of magnitude and may have triggered the ice age by reflecting sunlight back into space.

Volcanic aerosols 
Although volcanic activity often leads to warming through the release of greenhouse gasses, it may also lead to cooling via the production of aerosols, light-blocking particles. There is good evidence for elevated volcanic activity through the Hirnantian, based on anomalously high concentrations of mercury (Hg) in many areas. Sulphur dioxide (SO2) and other sulphurous volcanic gasses are converted into sulphate aerosols in the stratosphere, and short, periodic large igneous province eruptions may be able to account for cooling in this way. Although there is no direct evidence for a large igneous province during the Hirnantian, volcanism could still be a major factor. Explosive volcanic eruptions, which regularly send debris and volatiles into the stratosphere, would be even more effective at producing sulfate aerosols. Ash beds are common in the Late Ordovician, and Hirnantian pyrite records sulphur isotope anomalies consistent with stratospheric eruptions. The enormous megaeruption that formed the Deicke bentonite layer in particular has been linked to global cooling due to it coinciding with a major positive oxygen isotope excursion and the high sulphur concentration observed in its bentonite layer.

Sea level change 
One of the possible causes for the temperature drop during this period is a drop in sea level. Sea level must drop prior to the initiation of extensive ice sheets in order for it to be a possible trigger. A drop in sea level allows more land to become available for ice sheet growth.  There is wide debate on the timing of sea level change, but there is some evidence that a sea level drop started before the Ashgillian, which would have made it a contributing factor to glaciation.

Poleward ocean heat transport 
Ocean heat transport is a major driver in the warming of the poles, taking warm water from the equator and distributing it to higher latitudes. A weakening of this heat transport may have allowed the poles to cool enough to form ice under high CO2 conditions. Due to the paleogeographic configuration of the continents, global ocean heat transport is thought to have been stronger in the Late Ordovician. However, research shows that in order for glaciation to occur, poleward heat transport had to be lower, which creates a discrepancy in what is known.

Palaeogeography 
The possible setup of the paleogeography during the period from 460 Ma to 440 Ma falls in a range between the Caradocian and the Ashgillian. The choice of setup is important, because the Caradocian setup is more likely to produce glacial ice at high CO2 concentrations, and the Ashgillian is more likely to produce glacial ice at low CO2 concentrations.

The height of the land mass above sea level also plays an important role, especially after ice sheets have been established.  A higher elevation allows ice sheets to remain with more stability, but a lower elevation allows ice sheets to develop more readily. The Caradocian is considered to have a lower surface elevation, and though it would be better for initiation during high CO2, it would have a harder time maintaining glacial coverage.

Orbital parameters 
Orbital parameters may have acted in conjunction with some of the above parameters to help start glaciation. The variation of the earth's precession, and eccentricity, could have set the off the tipping point for initiation of glaciation.  The Orbit at this time is thought to have been in a cold summer orbit for the southern hemisphere. This type of orbital configuration is a change in the orbital precession such that during the summer when the hemisphere is tilted toward the sun (in this case the earth) the earth is furthest away from the sun, and orbital eccentricity such that the orbit of the earth is more elongated which would enhance the effect of precession.

Coupled models have shown that in order to maintain ice at the pole in the southern hemisphere, the earth would have to be in a cold summer configuration. The glaciation was most likely to start during a cold summer period because this configuration enhances the chance of snow and ice surviving throughout the summer.

End of the event 
The cause for the end of the Late Ordovician Glaciation is a matter of intense research, but evidence shows that the deglaciation in the terminal Hirnantian may have occurred abruptly, as Silurian strata marks a significant change from the glacial deposits left during the Late Ordovician. Though the Hirnantian glaciation ended rapidly, milder glaciations continued to occur throughout the subsequent Silurian period, with the last glacial phase occurring in the Late Silurian.

Ice collapse 
One of the possible causes for the end of the Hirnantian glaciation is that during the glacial maximum, the ice reached out too far and began collapsing on itself. The ice sheet initially stabilized once it reached as far north as  Ghat, Libya and developed a large proglacial fan-delta system. A glaciotectonic fold and thrust belt began to form from repeated small-scale fluctuations in the ice. The glaciotectonic fold and thrust belt eventually led to ice sheet collapse and retreat of the ice to south of Ghat. Once stabilized south of Ghat, the ice sheet began advancing north again. This cycle slowly shrank more south each time which lead to further retreat and further collapse of glacial conditions. This recursion allowed the melting of the ice sheet, and rising sea level. This hypothesis is supported by glacial deposits and large land formations found in Ghat, Libya which is part of the Murzuq Basin.

CO2 
As the Ice sheets began to increase the weathering of silicate rocks and basaltic important to carbon sequestration (the silicates through the Carbonate–silicate cycle, the basalt through forming calcium carbonate) decreased, which caused  levels to rise again, this in turned helped push deglaciation. This deglaciation cause the transformation of silicates exposed to the air (thus given the opportunity to bind to its ) and weathering of basaltic rock to start back up which caused glaciation to occur again.

Significance 
Even before the mass extinction at the end of the Ordovician, which resulted in a significant drop in chitinozoan diversity and abundance, the biodiversity of chitinozoans was adversely impacted by the onset of the Andean-Saharan glaciation. Following a peak in diversity in the late Darriwilian, chitinozoans declined in diversity as the Late Ordovician progressed. An exception to this declining trend of chitinozoan diversity was exhibited in Laurentia due to its low latitude position and warmer climate. 

The Late Ordovician Glaciation coincided with the second largest of the five major extinction events, known as the Late Ordovician mass extinction. This period is the only known glaciation to occur alongside of a mass extinction event. The extinction event consisted of two discrete pulses. The first pulse of extinctions is thought to have taken place because of the rapid cooling, and increased oxygenation of the water column. This first pulse was the larger of the two and caused the extinction of most of the marine animal species that existed in the shallow and deep oceans. The second phase of extinction was associated with strong sea level rise, and due to the atmospheric conditions, namely oxygen levels being at or below 50% of present-day levels, high levels of anoxic waters would have been common. This anoxia would have killed off many of the survivors of the first extinction pulse. In all the extinction event of the Late Ordovician saw a loss of 85% of marine animal species and 26% of animal families.

The deglaciation at the end of the Homerian glacial interval was coeval with the first major radiation of trilete spore-producing plants, harbingering the dawn of the Silurian-Devonian Terrestrial Revolution. The later middle Ludfordian glaciation caused a sea level drop that created vast areas of new terrestrial habitats that were promptly colonised by land plants, further facilitating their diversification. The warming during the Pridoli that marked the end of the Andean-Saharan glaciation saw further floral expansion.

See also 
 Timeline of glaciation
 Ordovician–Silurian extinction events
 Late Paleozoic icehouse

References 

Glaciology
Ice ages
Ordovician events
Silurian events
Ordovician Africa
Silurian Africa
Ordovician South America
Silurian South America
Aeronian
Telychian
Hirnantian
Katian
Sandbian
Darriwilian